"No Se Me Hace Fácil" (English: It's Not Easy For Me) is a song written by Gian Marco and produced by Áureo Baqueiro, recorded by Mexican performer Alejandro Fernández, and released as the third single from Viento a Favor (2007), It was released on September 17, 2007 (see 2007 in music). The song was the theme song for the Televisa's Mexican telenovela Tormenta en el Paraíso (2007-2008), produced by Juan Osorio.

Music video

The music video for this single was directed by Pablo Croce. The actress Ana de la Reguera stars in the video.

Chart performance
In United States, on the Billboard Hot Latin Songs the single peaked at number 17. In Mexico the track peaked at number 1.

References

2007 singles
2007 songs
Alejandro Fernández songs
Songs written by Gian Marco
Song recordings produced by Áureo Baqueiro
Telenovela theme songs
Sony BMG Norte singles
2000s ballads
Pop ballads
Gian Marco songs